FIRMS may refer to:
 Fishery Resources Monitoring System
 Fire Information for Resource Management System, near real-time active fire locations provided by NASA

See also
 Firm (disambiguation)